The Match Europe v USA was an international two-day outdoor track and field competition between the United States and Europe. It took place 9–10 September 2019 in Minsk, Belarus, three weeks prior to the 2019 World Athletics Championships in Doha, Qatar,  a few days after the conclusion of the 2019 Diamond League and three months after the 2019 European Games. 

Team Europe won the Match, defeating Team USA by 724½ to 601½.

Creation of the Match

The match was agreed between European Athletics and USA Track & Field in December 2018 and marked the first international match between the two since the 1960s. The competition followed the successful creation of the Athletics World Cup in 2018, which included the United States and several European nations. Athletes from the United States and Europe also compete in the quadrennial IAAF Continental Cup, though American athletes are part of a combined Americas team rather than a national one. Minsk also played host to the 2019 European Games that year, the athletics portion of which was a national team matchplay competition held in the new DNA Athletics format..

The program

Events
The event programme consisted of 37 events, and includes six individual track running events, three obstacle events, four jumping events, four throwing events, and a sprint relay event for each sex. There is also a 1600 metres mixed-sex sprint medley relay with four athletes running 200, 200, 400 and 800 metres, similar to a mixed 4 × 400 metres relay which will be introduced at the 2020 Summer Olympics.

Track events
Running
100 metres, 200 metres, 400 metres, 800 metres, 1500 metres, 3000 metres
Obstacle events
100 metres hurdles (women only), 110 metres hurdles (men only), 400 metres hurdles, 3000 metres steeplechase
Relay events
4 × 100 metres relay, 1600 metres sprint medley relay (mixed)

Field events
Jumping events
Pole vault, high jump, long jump, triple jump
Throwing events
Shot put, discus throw, javelin throw, hammer throw

Special match rules applied to the field events. For the six Horizontal field events (all four throwing events, the long and triple jumps), there were three initial attempts in each event. Following this, the top six  athletes from these trials advanced to the final three  rounds.  At each subsequent round, the lowest placing athlete, based on all attempts thus far in the competition, was eliminated. In the vertical jumps (high jump and pole vault) each competitor was limited to three attempts at any specific height and eight attempts in total.

Scoring

Each team was allowed to field 4 athletes in each individual event, and two teams of four in each relay. The winner of each individual event and each relay scored 9 points, the second 7 points, the third score 6, and so on. The highest score either team could achieve in a single event was therefore 27 points, and the lowest (barring disqualification, failure to finish or record a mark) 10 (or in relays, 16 and 11 respectively). 

Across the competition, a theoretical high score of 966 points was available, and a theoretical low score, ignoring disqualifications, DNFs and no marks, of 373. However, the match would be won once either team achieves over half of all available points - the winning post for the Match before it commenced was therefore 670 points. Following withdrawals and 'no marks' on day one of the Match, the winning post was recalculated as 662 points. Europe secured victory when they reached a 664½–560½ lead. The final result was 724½–601½.

3½ points was awarded for dead heat for 5th place in 400m hurdles men.

Prize money
The organiser of the event will award prize money to the competitors. For relay events, the winning team will receive €6,000, the runners-up €4,000, and the third-placers €2,000. The prize money structure for individual events is as follows:

€7,000
€5,000
€4,000
€3,000
€2,000
€1,000
€500
€500

Results

Men

Women

Mixed

Final scores

 17 events were won by Team Europe; Team USA won 20.
 Team Europe achieved 64 podium positions; Team USA achieved 47.

References

External links
Official website

Match
Match
Match
Match
Match
Match
Match
Team combination track and field competitions